Rodez ( or ;) is a small city and commune in the South of France, about 150 km northeast of Toulouse. It is the prefecture of the department of Aveyron, region of Occitania (formerly Midi-Pyrénées). Rodez is the seat of the communauté d'agglomération Rodez Agglomération, of the First Constituency of Aveyron as well as of the general Council of Aveyron.

Former capital of the Rouergue, the city is seat of the Diocese of Rodez and Vabres. Its inhabitants are called Ruthénois, from the name of the Ruteni, a Gallic tribe which once occupied the territory, the former demonym of "Rodanois" (from Occitan rodanés) having given way to this scholarly form.

Geography

Location
It extends into , with the communes of Onet-le-Château, Sainte-Radegonde, Le Monastère, Olemps and Luc-la-Primaube, which forms an agglomeration of 83,000 habitants adjoining the city of Rodez.

Geology and landforms
The territory of Rodez is packed with geological diversity. It straddles the ancient base of Ségala composed of acidic siliceous soil of Les Rougiers consisting of red argillite, and causses composed of limestones and marls. The city was built on a conical isolated terrain, locally called Le Piton, and gradually spread to the surrounding slopes. It is located in a seismicity level 2 zone which is a low level.

Hydrography
The Aveyron crosses the commune and is important for fishing. Green spaces are proposed for the  Quarter, and the  stream.

Climate
Rodez's climate, a supra-Mediterranean level, is a Mediterranean climate (Csb), and is colder compared to other cities in the south of France. Winters are sharp and summers often very hot and sunny.

In 2011, with nearly 2,400 hours or 304 days of sunshine per year, Rodez was ranked 2,407th of French cities in terms of sunshine, significantly above the national average.

Events based on the data of Météo-France at Millau Soulobres station, from 1965:

On 28 January 2006, Rodez experienced an important snow episode. A metre of powdery snow accumulated, crippling the Let Piton economy for several days.

Transportation
Rodez is a growing city and an important economic engine in the Midi-Pyrénées since the early 2000s.

As of 2005, the Aveyron department continues to improve its regional connectivity. Future plans (2018) call for the entire ring road to be a dual carriageway as part of the 2014-2018 plan. Three grade separated roundabouts are planned as part of the dualing urban boulevard project: Moutiers, La Gineste and Saint-Marc. A major bypass is also proposed but without a specific deadline.

In 2009, the Rodez-Aveyron Airport expanded its terminal and introduction of new international scheduled destinations.

Local transportation options include car rentals and the local bus system (Agglobus). The city centre (centre ville), with its cobblestone streets lined with ancient buildings hundreds of years old, is pedestrian friendly.

Routes

Railway lines
The rail network has undergone numerous restructurings, including the plan rail Midi-Pyrénées. Between 2009 and 2013, replacement of rails, the rehabilitation of structures, replacement of information systems traffic operations on the Rodez-Toulouse and Rodez-Paris lines have resulted in network improvement . Additionally, the region was equipped with new TER trains in 2013 that are faster and more comfortable.

Main roads
Rodez is situated along  (route linking Toulouse to Lyon), transformed in the Rodez area into an urban boulevard [dual carriageways, many on and off sliproads, speed limited to between ] to allow the flow of traffic totalling 35,000 vehicles per day.  are buried to assess traffic for transcription by real-time traffic maps. The portion of this highway, declared a national priority in 1993 between Rodez and Albi, is currently in the process of restructuring with the doubling of the carriageways, after decades of studies and that since 18 October 2010, date of the official launch of this vast site.

A portion of the RN88 road between Rodez and Carmaux should be completely converted into a dual carriageway expressway and put into service in 2018, thus allowing a virtually seamless dual carriageway journey between Rodez and Toulouse (with the exception of the portion between Albi and Carmaux the route upgrading to motorway is envisaged but not programmed to date). Indeed, the A68 has been in service between Albi and Toulouse for several years. As of 2018, the RN88 which is an extension of the A68 will then almost all be dual carriageway, thus reducing the time between Rodez and Toulouse. Note that this axis is one of the largest in the Midi-Pyrénées in terms of traffic. As for the portion of the RN88 between Rodez and Sévérac-le-Château, this last link is missing dual carriageway, studies are underway but work will not begin before 2020 due to lack of credits granted. At the end of this work, the entire journey will be converted into dual carriageway between Rodez and the principal cities around the Mediterranean.

Furthermore, the segment of the city between Espalion and Rodez underwent a restructuring with the diversion of Curlande commissioned in 2011. A bypass project of the town of Espalion is ongoing since the beginning of this year towards the west of the Lot Valley and Aurillac. With the RN88 which is the most important artery of the agglomeration, Rodez is the focal point of several routes from its own department or bordering departments:

The  which provides access to Albi, Castres, Montpellier, Toulouse to the south and Clermont-Ferrand, Lyon, Orléans, Paris and also Millau, Sète, Béziers, Narbonne and Perpignan to the north.
The  joins to Villefranche-de-Rouergue, Cahors, Villeneuve-sur-Lot, then the autoroute to Bordeaux.

Transport network

Rail

The railway station of Rodez, located on Avenue du Maréchal Joffre, is the main station of Aveyron. There are daily trains to Paris and Toulouse, as well as other trains and buses connecting Rodez to smaller towns. It serves Paris-Austerlitz (Intercités), Toulouse-Matabiau (TER), Brive-la-Gaillarde (TER), Millau (TER and regional bus), Montpellier (bus with mandatory charging at Millau station) and other stations of the department and bordering departments. In addition, it is noted that many other large French cities can be reached by the connections in Toulouse and Brive. The lines and railway infrastructure have undergone important renovations with the complete change of the rails, the modernisation of technical systems and structures as well as the implementation of new systems of traffic management. In the next few years, the aim is for a time of 1 hour 45 minutes from Rodez to Toulouse and 4 hours 50 minutes from Rodez to Paris through the LGV Poitiers-Limoges.

In the past, the Rodez and Aveyron rail network was part of the company of the Chemins de fer du Midi. Formerly, there was a second station, that of "Paraire" below the current Lycée Foch, close to the city centre but closed in the 1970s. Today, there is no service there.

Road
Rodez is the central point of numerous bus routes coming from the department or bordering departments. Indeed, there are currently nearly 60 routes.

Air
 

Rodez is served by the nearby Rodez Marcillac Airport, located within the commune of Salles-la-Source. The international airport of Rodez-Aveyron is the third airport of the Occitanie region after Toulouse and Tarbes, and the main platform of the south of the Massif Central, with direct scheduled flights to:

 Paris-Orly 
 Southampton Airport
 Dublin
 Bruxelles-Charleroi

Public transport
The city has had a longstanding public transport system, the  having circulated from 1902 to 1920. Nowadays, these journeys are made by buses. It allows service to the centre of Rodez from outside communes (and vice versa) before 8am with a time range for operation of the service between 7am (5am for some lines) and 8pm. These lines have scheduled timing. This network is complemented by an evening service that operates Monday to Saturday, from 8pm to 11:30pm, by a transport service scheduled running Monday to Saturday with two round trips per day, and for persons with reduced mobility which works at the same times as the bus network. The Rodez topography makes it difficult to create special lanes for buses. As such, the Agglobus network is equipped with a system of prioritisation at traffic lights and also a geolocation for buses.

Postal transport
Rodez has had an operational sorting centre since July 2009. It receives about 400,000 letters every day and processes 14 per second. All of the letters posted from Rodez to a destination within the agglomeration and its own region are delivered the next morning. Courier services, international and domestic carriers are also present in Rodez. The city has three post offices with its central office located in the city centre, at Place Foch, near the cathedral. Other branches are located in the suburbs as well as in the Bourran Quarter. In addition, other communes forming the urban agglomeration of the Grand Rodez also have their post offices, including the Aveyron sorting centre located in the commune of Onet-le-Château.

Urban planning

Urban morphology

Rodez is an ancient city, the road becomes gradually narrower as it approaches  [Old Rodez] and the remains of the ancient city fortress are still strongly present in the form of ramparts. Its hyper-centre is extended over many streets and pedestrian alleys between the squares of Place du Bourg, Place de l'Olmet, Place de la Cité and the Place de la Madeleine, one discovers typical houses in a mostly preserved historical setting. In these squares markets or fairs are held while the Passage du Mazel hosts a daily trade of fresh and seasonal produce. Pedestrian streets, very concentrated in the old centre, today are a place of life with many commercial signs. Road traffic is carried around the walls located on the boulevards of Estourmel, Belle Isle, Denys Puech and Flaugergues encircling the centre and served by streets parallel to this historic heart.

Beyond Vieux-Rodez, the city expanded during the 20th century. To meet the demands of the era, new neighbourhoods and economic zones were developed. Rodez was, during the post-war period, an average city that had the most buildings beyond its circular boulevards. Finally, the creation of the Bourran Viaduct allowed the extension of the city beyond the Auterne Valley.

The town of Rodez is part of the Grands Sites de Midi-Pyrénées. It continues to work to obtain the label Ville d'Art et d'Histoire and wishes to file its candidacy for UNESCO world heritage. Thus, the historic centre, and joined developments, are designed to meet the criteria of these institutions.

The municipality is divided into five major quarters:

Housing
Rodez has many rental housing units. In addition, the average of new housing has four rooms. Its housing stock remains fairly young, 59% of dwellings are from subsequent to World War II. Despite this, planning is progressing day by day and the homes and other premises have increased by 23% each year.

Arrangements of the "Forail-Cathedral" axis

Quadrilatère Combarel
The now demolished old Combarel hospital will be replaced by housing and green spaces. Since the 19th century, the Combarel hospital enjoyed a privileged location in the heart of the city and at the centre of the agglomeration. The purchase of the former hospital by the agglomeration of Grand Rodez aims to impose the site as a centre of activity of the city, as it once was. A conversion will redraw all of the area and allow it to become a real neighbourhood to live, in order to revitalise the heart of the metropolitan area of Grand Rodez. The district wants a place with trees and green space, in which can be found housing as well tertiary activities, shops. The whole of the  area will be mid-residential and mid-institutional, probably with the construction of a new hotel. This area will be part of a construction complying with environmental standards. The project is based on maintaining, on the upper plateau, the entire quadrilatère and chapel, as well as the development of the former Capuchin convent.

Forail public garden
The Foirail public garden, and the Esplanade du Foirail, is located in the heart of the city. Consisting of a large courtyard with various mood lighting, it can accommodate some entertainments and events (concerts, outdoor performances etc.). This place has coherence with the various cultural and economic facilities which are adjacent (festival hall, cinema multiplex and the centre of L'Amphitheatre). Finally, the public garden located nearby, having gained 20% more land after the redevelopment of the area, offers different walks around the different peripheral facilities.

Multiplex cinema
The multiplex consists of 10 cinema rooms with between 68 and 404 seats, spread over two levels with a total of 1580 seats opened in November 2013. Double access (next to the Giratoire de l'Europe and Avenue Victor-Hugo). A fast food area as well as a night beerhouse are integrated within the confines of the cinema centre having also two other shops.

Underground parking
It opened at the same time as the multiplex.

Exhibition park
This project, scheduled for the commune of Olemps will open its doors in the second half of 2016, after work which will begin in 2015. This will be designed to host cultural performances, economic events or conferences, with a set of 3,000 seats.

Toponymy
In antiquity, during the Roman occupation, the city was named Segodunum. The roots being sego "strong" and dunum "hill", where Segodunum "high hill, stronghold" is at the origin of the Gaulish name of Rodez.

During the middle to the end of the Roman Empire, the city was called Civitas Rutenorum, the city of the Rutènes. Then, it became Ruteni and finally Rodez.

Rodez is locally pronounced ""Rodess" [ʀodɛs] in French. That is explained by the spelling of the city in Occitan: Rodés, pronounced "Rroodess" [rruˈðes]. Rodez was spelled with a final z, instead of s, to maintain the closed e of Occitan and to prevent it from becoming silent.

History
Existing from at least the 5th century BC, Rodez was founded by the Celts. After the Roman occupation, the oppidum (fortified place) was renamed Segodunum, while in late Imperial times it was known as Civitas Rutenorum, whence the modern name. After the fall of the Western Roman Empire, it was captured by the Visigoths and then by the Franks, being also ravaged by the Arabs in 725. Later it was occupied by the armies of the Dukes of Aquitaine and of the Counts of Toulouse. English troops occupied Rodez during the Hundred Years War.

However, in medieval times the city's history was marked by strong rivalry between the Counts and the Bishops of Rodez, who exerted their authorities in different sectors of the city, divided by a wall. The counts were able to defy the royal French authority until the submission of count John IV by the future King Louis XI in the 15th century. In the following century bishop François d'Estaing built the Rodez Cathedral.

The last count of Rodez, Henry VI of Rodez, who became Henry IV of France, sold his title to the Royal Crown in 1589. The city remained a flourishing merchant centre up to the 18th century, when the nearby town Villefranche-de-Rouergue was made the seat of the experimental Provincial Estates of the Haute-Guyenne.  However, with the French Revolution Rodez became the chef-lieu of the newly created department of the Aveyron and has remained so since.

Prehistory

Antiquity

Many elements of heritage bear witness to the Romanisation of Segodunum.

Middle Ages
Rodez was successively occupied by the Visigoths, the Franks, the armies of the Dukes of Aquitaine and the Counts of Toulouse, as well as by the Moors, who seized Rodez in 725, and damaged the ancient church. Years later, it was the English who captured Rodez, during the Hundred Years' War.

A wall separated the two sectors. Each community had a town hall, its consuls, and its own administration; each competing for power. To the town, the famous dynasty of the Counts of Armagnac and Rodez, eventually acquired sovereign privileges: Coining money at the Martelenque Tower, wearing the crown and persisting to recognise the antipope Benedict XIII and his heirs Bernard Garnier and Jean Carrier, for a time. This led inevitably to confrontation with the King of France in 1443. The dauphin, the future Louis XI, came to occupy Rodez and submit Count Jean IV. Later his son would have a seditious idea, trying to betray Louis XI. This caused him to be killed in Lectoure, with his family, during his escape.

Early Modern era
At the beginning of the 16th century, Rodez was marked by Bishop  (from one of the most famous families of Rouergue). He finished the work of construction of the Cathedral of Our Lady of Rodez. The works were completed in the fifteen years between 1510 and 1526 and this despite the plague ravaging the city.

The rivalry between the two powers somewhat served the development of Rodez. Despite the testimonies that are its many made Gothic masterpieces from the 13th to the 16th century, the city has not really experienced long periods of prosperity. In 1589, Henri IV, Count of Rodez, attached the destiny of the County of Rodez to the Crown. The story of Rodez then copied that of France. Throughout the 17th and 18th centuries, Rodez became a thriving market city.

Rodez was divided into 6 parishes:

Notre-Dame (cathedral, suburb)
Saint-Amans, including the hamlet of Pont-Viel, a large part of the territory of the current commune of Olemps (Olemps, La Mouline, Toizac, Linars, Benechou) and a part of the municipality of La Monastère (Foulhoubous)
Sainte-Catherine
La Madeleine (church demolished)
Saint-Martin-des-Prés (Layoule area)
Saint-Félix: The area of Saint-Felix, Calcomier, La Peyrinie, and the entire valley of the Fontanges stream located in the current municipality of Onet-le-Château (Canaguet, Fontanges, Floyrac, Labro, Puech Baurez Flars)

Modern era
The old rival of Rodez was Villefranche-de-Rouergue. The religious heritage of the city was only partially degraded.

In June 1792, the scientists of the time cared about to know the exact measurement of the metre. Rodez would be a "central" element to accomplish this measure. Indeed, Jean Baptiste Joseph Delambre was responsible for measuring the distance from Dunkirk to Rodez, while Pierre Méchain was the one measuring between Barcelona and Rodez. They were to meet in Rodez to combine their results and determine the value of the metre. In 1793, at Montjouy in Barcelona, Méchain detected an inconsistency between the recorded lengths and an astronomical survey of the position of the stars. The Franco-Spanish war prevented him from repeating measurements. This difference (which was in fact not due to a handling error but the uncertainty of the instruments used) plunged him into deep trouble and he made every effort to avoid having to report on his work in Paris. In 1799, he resigned himself to attend an international conference which welcomed his scientific work.

Rodez received many journalists, on this occasion, who described the behaviour of Rodez people from a very subjective standpoint.

The 19th century also experienced a cultural revival. The main leaders of the department were involved in the cultural life of the province. Modernisation of Rodez occurred very slowly during the 19th century. Little by little, Rodez evolved by affirming and developing its role as capital of the department of Aveyron from the 21st century, creating its own economy and independence, whilst remaining linked to Toulouse.

Politics and administration

List of mayors

Intercommunality

Established in 1964 and incorporated in the district, it then became an agglomeration community on 20 December 1999. Today, it has eight communes.

The commune, an important part of the southern Massif Central, is also close to other cities located in the southwest such as Toulouse and Albi, as well as in the centre and north of the Massif Central such as Aurillac and Mende with which it forms the Estelle city network.

Judicial and administrative authorities
The conurbation has a fire service barracks, a municipal police force, an SAMU and an SMUR (both medical emergency services), a poison control centre and a remand prison while the State administers the prefecture of the department, and a gendarmerie brigade. A new remand prison will be located in the commune of Druelle in July 2013 with a capacity of about 100 male inmates, including a capacity of ten for people eligible for day parole. Finally, the administrations of the State are present in Rodez (tax office, Bank of France, social security, family allowance, etc.).

The court of appeal is located in Montpellier.

Cantons of Rodez
Since 2015, Rodez is the chef-lieu of three cantons:

Rodez-1 comprises the western part of Rodez.
Rodez-2 comprises the commune of Le Monastère and the central and eastern part of Rodez.
Rodez-Onet comprises the commune of Onet-le-Château and the northern part of Rodez.

Environmental policy

International relations
Rodez is twinned with:
 Bamberg, Germany, since 1970

Honorary citizens
Íngrid Betancourt has been an honorary citizen of the city of Rodez since 28 March 2008.

Municipal administration
The city council has 35 seats, arranged in a semicircle, of which 26 are occupied by the Socialist majority and nine seats by the opposition.

Political trends and results

Municipal elections of 23 and 30 March 2014
Outgoing mayor: Christian Teyssèdre (Socialist Party)
35 seats in the municipal council (2011 legal population: 23,794 inhabitants)
21 seats in the community council

Municipal elections of 2008
Outgoing mayor:  (UMP)

Legislative and presidential elections

2012 legislative elections

Outgoing Député: Yves Censi (UMP)

2012 French Presidential election
Outgoing President: Nicolas Sarkozy

Population and society

Demography

Demographic evolution
In 2017, the commune had 24,057 inhabitants.

With 24,057 inhabitants in 2017, Rodez remained the most populous commune of the Aveyron department, ahead of Millau. The communauté d'agglomération Rodez Agglomération had 55,851 inhabitants in 2018, the unité urbaine of Rodez 47,666 inhabitants, and the aire d'attraction of Rodez 111,885 inhabitants. The population of Rodez has reached its maximum in 1975 (25,550), and has stabilized since then around 24,000.

Age structure
The population of the commune is relatively young in comparison with the department. Especially the age group 15–29 years is larger than average, due to the presence of institutes of higher education in Rodez.

Education
The commune is located in the Academy of Toulouse. The city administers five  and six . The department manages two  and the region three lycées.

Higher education

Rodez has to date more than 2,500 students on its agglomeration. After the restructuring and extension of the IUT between 2009 and 2012, this campus is implemented throughout the domain of EDF-GDF. Ultimately this site should concentrate more than 10,000 students of science subjects, hydroelectricity, mechanical or food production.

Employability

The Communal Office of Employment Training (MCEF), located at 41-43 Rue Béteille opened its doors in March 2013 after two years of work. This area of  includes the employment centre and its service platform, the local mission for employment of youth, the inter-institutional centre of personal and professional skills assessment (CIBC), the Information Centre and Orientation (academic inspection), the territorial office Aveyron, Cap Employment, the AFIJ (graduates) and the Aveyron branch of ADEFPAT which is a regional structure whose mission is to reinforce the strategies of territorial development. 55 employees work on all the services present in this institution which covers a pool of 142,000 inhabitants.

Educational associations

The Calandreta schools (in Occitan, petite alouette) are Franco-Occitan bilingual colleges and schools.

Health

Jacques-Puel Hospital
This medical, surgical, gynaecology and obstetrics (MCO) hospital with emergency adult and paediatric facilities, is the second regional technical platform after the CHU de Purpan in Toulouse. It is the headquarters of the SAMU and SMUR of Aveyron, and has nearly 60 medical and surgical services. Specialised and ultra-specialised in the disciplines of medicine, paediatrics, neonatology, oncology and surgery, it holds medical equipment of the latest generation.

Saint-Louis surgical specialties clinic

After a restructuring between 2007 and 2010, the Saint-Louis Clinic is a large installation between the Boulevard d'Estournel, Rue Cabrière and 22 Rue Béteille. This clinic is equipped with a laboratory for medical analyses and a radiological platform equipped with an MRI scanner. Surgical specialties in this clinic are: The clinic was closed in January 2014.

Other centres of care nearby

In the commune of Olemps,  from Rodez, are also the Les Peyrieres Hospital and Sainte-Marie Hospital.

Sports
Rodez is home to Rodez AF (called le Raf by its fans) of the Ligue 2 (Second Division). The women's team is in the First Division and are known as les Rafettes. Rodez also has rugby, basketball, handball and fencing teams.

Infrastructure

The city has numerous sports facilities. It is composed of the dojo gym, sports rooms of l'Amphithéâtre and the Aquavallon aquatic centre. The Paul Lignon Stadium is located nearby. Many other sports complexes are present in the metropolitan area. All these facilities are intended to improve the reception of sports clubs of the city, whether they are independent or federated in combination as the Rodez Omnisports Stadium.

The various sports institutions:

L'Amphithéâtre Cultural Centre has several rooms in order to practice badminton, basketball, boxing, climbing, fencing, martial arts, gymnastics and table tennis.
Dojo gym: Badminton, basketball, handball, volleyball, judo
Paul Lignon Stadium: Football, rugby
The Vabre complex: Athletics, basketball, football, handball, rugby, tennis, volleyball
The Trauc complex: Football, rugby, archery
Louis Polonia Stadium: Football, pétanque, quilles de huit
Boulodromes of Camonil and Saint-Éloi: Petanque
Fabre Gymnasium: Basketball, volleyball
Avenue de Paris, Sports Valley, Le Trauc: Shooting stands
Ramadier City Stadium: Basketball, football
Nautical centre: Swimming, competitions, aquatic activities, sauna, hammam
Domaine de Combelles: Riding centre

Rodez will welcome the return of the Tour de France in 2015, for the finish of Stage 13, on 17 July, and the departure of Stage 14, on 18 July.

Associations

These are the principal sports clubs of the commune. In fencing, Rodez Aveyron currently plays in Division 1 for men's team and women's team. The men's team was champion of France's division 1 in 2012 and 2014, 3rd in the European Cup of Champion Clubs in 2013 and runner up of Europe 2015. The Rodez Badminton (CBR) Club organises a tournament every year of national scope at l'Amphithéâtre. The Vélo-Club Ruthénois [Ruthénois Cycling Club], founded in 1891, is the oldest sports club in the city.

R.A.F. (Rodez Aveyron Football)
R.S.A. (Stade Rodez Aveyron), rugby
S.R.A.B.
C.B.R. (Rodez Badminton Club)
Rodez athletics stadium
Stage Ruthenois Tennis
Gym-Club Ruthenois
Judo Rodez Aveyron
Grand Rodez swimming
Fencing Rodez Aveyron
Vélo-Club Ruthenois
Sport keel Ruthenois
R.O.C. Aveyron Handball
Combelles riding club

Military life
Headquarters of the Army of Aveyron, located in Rodez, near .

The regiments whose barracks were in Rodez:

 (1879-1897)
 (1913)

Non-divisional elements:

, split from the 122nd infantry regiment in 1914

Media

Local and regional print media

Rodez is the seat of the  newspaper. It is part of the  Group. The group lies in vast premises, on Avenue Victor Hugo, at the foot of the Cathedral of Rodez. Indeed, there are three daily newspapers of local and regional news being edited every day, namely the Centre Presse, La Dépêche du Midi and Midi Libre.

A monthly journal is published by the General Council of Aveyron which tells the news of the institution each month, and the same for the city of Rodez which has its own monthly called Rodez, notre ville [Rodez, our city]. Finally, a quarterly published by the Midi-Pyrénées region is delivered to the mailbox of each person in Rodez.

National and international press

The city has the national and international press in its kiosks. To facilitate the work on press articles, the media library of Rodez contains many archives, such as the departmental archives and the house of the press.

Radio

Finally, Radio Temps [Time Radio] (107 FM) was created in the Lycée Louis Querbes.

Television

The commune has had digital terrestrial television channels since 1 June 2008. A television studio is installed here in order to present the newscasts for Quercy-Rouergue Aveyron-Lot. Finally, the idea of establishing a continuous channel dedicated to the town of Rodez was born. The city of Rodez has broadcast digital television channels to replace analogue broadcasts, since 8 November 2011.

Internet and telephony

Rodez has broadband internet cable technology and Wi-Fi as well as commissioning, in 2008, several kilometres of fibre optic coupled to WiMAX and UMTS base stations across  and particularly to trading areas such as the international airport, railway station, Bourran Quarter and the historic centre. The 3G, 3G+ and 4G networks allow the digital opening up of the city of Rodez. The various road works, in the city centre, and especially in the historic heart, allowed new internet loops of very high-speed to be built between 2011 and 2012.

Religion, philosophical and humanist associations

The city of Rodez, seat of the bishopric, is part of the parish of Our Lady of the Assumption, which includes 6 branches: Cathedral Notre-Dame de Rodez, Saint Amans, Le Monastère, La Mouline, Gorgan and Sacré-Cœur.  is the Bishop of Rodez since 2011.

The Protestant temple of Rodez (Reformed Church of France) was erected in 1947, on Rue Louis Lacombe.

The Evangelical Reformed Church of Rodez is located on the Séverac road to Onet-le-Château.

The Rodez mosque built on the Avenue de Bamberg between 2000 and 2002, was inaugurated in May 2003. The religious building was expanded between 2010 and 2011.

Rodez has several Masonic Lodges:

"La Parfaite Union" (Grand Orient de France) created in 1762 and in which Paul Ramadier was initiated in 1913.
"Le Réveil du Rouergue" (Grande Loge de France)
"Le Droit Humain"

Cultural events and festivities
In summer, the city offers many entertainments and festive events. Three museums and many art galleries (Gallery Sainte-Catherine among others) attract many tourists. Finally on the side of young people,  student associations are present and, in addition, throughout the year, many bar-restaurants and bar-discos of the city participate in entertainment on the Ruthenois Piton ("terrasses en fêtes" [terraces in festivals], for example).

There are several music venues and festivals in or near Rodez. Music venues La Guinguette and Le Studio often host concerts, as does the local amphitheatre, and the local Maisons des Jeunes et de la Culture of Rodez and Onet-Le-Château.

Skabazac is probably the best-known music festival, and it takes place in mid-June. Just on the outskirts of Rodez in a town called Sébazac, Skabazac attracted over 30,000 people in 2010, when Cypress Hill headlined. In 2011 the festival's 13th edition was cancelled due to a lack of government funding. In midsummer the Occitan festival, called Estivada, takes place over several days. The festival promotes Occitan culture with food, cultural displays, and live music.

In order to preserve the traditions of folklore and the Occitan language, the langue d'Oc, two folk groups are based in Rodez. La Pastourelle (the young Shepherdess in Occitan) founded in 1948 and the Escloupeto (the carrier of hooves in Occitan) in 1953. It is through music, dances, songs and costumes from southern folklore that the various volunteers, we are revisiting the era. Occitan theatre is also part of their repertoire. The popular folklore of the Aveyron was created in Pont-de-Salars, at the International Folklore Festival of Rouergue in 1955.

Economy

Over the main city of the province, with 20,000 inhabitants, Rodez is, according to INSEE the 13th most prosperous urban unit of France just behind most of the cities in Île-de-France such as Saint-Cloud, Courbevoie, Paris and Suresnes. It is the 28th city where there are the most "jobs on the spot", Rodez is also the 91st commune of France in terms of viable start-ups by inhabitants (1 per 116 inhabitants) and the 157th in terms of share of taxed households representing 58 per cent (well above the national average). This result can be explained by two mechanisms. First, the diversity of the economic base is that companies of Rodez touch on numerous and varied areas. Moreover, Rodez was for many years separated from the major national economies without relevant communications. To do this, it endeavoured by its own skills to produce and build its own corporate panel in order to sustain its territory.

Income of the population and taxation
In 2017, the median income per household was €20,410, and 51% of households had to pay income tax.

Employment
Today, Rodez is the main employment area of Aveyron. The Aveyron inhabitants have three lives in the area of influence of Rodez. The geographical location of Rodez at the junction of the major Aveyron communication routes has long channelled a rural exodus to the prefecture: The presence of an airport and the improvement of the road network to Toulouse today contributes to the dynamism of the Rodez area with the emergence of many jobs.

In January 2017, the active population of the municipality was 10,994 people, or 70.4% of its inhabitants aged 15–64 years. The unemployment rate among those aged 15–64 was 9.2%.

Businesses
Rodez and its agglomeration focus a wide range of businesses and economic sectors, by automotive equipment with the Bosch Group, by research on GMOs and the distribution of seeds for agriculture with the national headquarters of the  group within the grouping , aeronautics with the Sofop working for Airbus Industries or its international airport platform, health with its hospital, computing with the Sopra Group, and the food industry. This set of dynamics places the agglomeration of Rodez in second place in economic growth in the Midi-Pyrénées after its regional capital, Toulouse. These companies are one of the keys to the "engineering valley".

Rodez is the seat of the Chamber of Commerce and Industry of Aveyron located in the city centre and in the district of Bourran. The  is the second largest economy of southwestern France where there are 2,700 companies in Grand Rodez and 1,500 in the centre of Rodez. Finally, there was an increase of 14.5% for the creation of companies on Rodez and its region between 2000 and 2006. The rate of survival of businesses was 71.5%, three years after opening. Major centres include:

The  with its 2,000 employees is the second platform of health of the Midi-Pyrénées region.
Robert Bosch Rodez with 1,700 employees is the largest industrial employer in the department of Aveyron. Designated reference site in regards to glow plugs, the injector "common rail", became the standard on diesel systems, is the "flagship" product, according to the director of the Albert Weitten Group. The company of the project was expected to produce 1,800,000 for 2011.
The Sainte-Marie Clinic in Rodez: 1,000 employees
The Saint-Louis Clinic in Rodez: closed in 2013
OPRA Group Inforsud with 400 employees (computer engineering).
Verdie Travel Group employs 250 employees and many seasonal (tour operator) or even the Group CLC NACEL, 150 employees and also many seasonal (tour operator).

In the year 2018, 208 companies were created in the territory.

Economic centres of the territory

The present economic hubs on Rodez and/or its suburbs are closely linked with the chef-lieu. Found:

: Services and administrations of the State, private enterprises, health.
Zone of Bel Air: Close to the international airport of Rodez, it is the first business park of Grand Rodez.
Zone of La Gineste: With its  in the heart of Rodez, it focuses in trade activities and services dominant to new technologies. A dozen companies are located here, including RM Ingénierie [RM Engineering], ETI, RDS and D’Médica.
Zone of the Balquieres: Automotive centre of Grand Rodez, located just outside Rodez. Several companies are present including Peugeot, Citroën, Ford, Volvo, Land Rover, Mercedes, etc.
Zone of Cantaranne: One of the areas of "historic" activities dedicated to industry, craft and wholesale trade in the communes of Onet-le-Château and Rodez.
Zone of Montvert: This is located at Luc-La Primaube, and devoted to crafts and small logistics (on the edge of the RN88).
Zone of Malan: Crafts and industry, an exhibition park in 2016.

Agriculture
Rodez is traditionally an agricultural trade centre. The city is the headquarters of Aveyron agriculture through its departmental chamber of agriculture. However, within the city walls, Rodez has little to no farming (0.8% of the distribution of jobs). Beyond the city and agglomeration, agricultural activity is present. During the 2011 session of the Congress of Young Farmers held in Rodez, Bruno Le Maire, Minister of Food, Agriculture and Fisheries, as well as Rurality and Development, came to close this congress.

Trade
Rodez and its suburbs have developed local trade and large national brands, during the 21st century, to avoid a brain drain to the major centres like Toulouse and Montpellier. The city developed businesses in the city centre and its surroundings (commercial hub of  located at Sébazac-Concourès).

The city market is held three times per week (Wednesday morning, Friday afternoon and Saturday morning). A large fair happens each quarter on Le Piton in Rodez.

Tourism
The development of road, rail and air transport, and also its UNESCO World Heritage candidacy contributes to a positive and dynamic tourist area (300,000 tourists each year to the Rodez Cathedral). Finally, the office of tourism of Rodez conducts guided tours of the monuments and landmarks of the city. However, beyond the city, tourists have also turned to the major centres of the department such as the lakes of Lévézou, Conques, Laguiole to the north of the department. The Millau Viaduct to the south provides the junction of the A75 to the Mediterranean Sea and also the most beautiful villages of France which place the department of Aveyron at the forefront of the French departments hosting the prettiest villages. The Grand Rodez tourist office is located on the Place de la Cité (opened in July 2013).

Gastronomy
There are three weekly farmers' markets. On Wednesday mornings the market is located in Place du Bourg. On Saturday mornings, the market expands into Place de la Cité and Place Emma Calvé (behind the cathedral). On Friday evenings there is a small farmers' market on the Parking du Sacré Cœur.

Several restaurants serve local specialities, notably aligot, farçous, tripoux, and Roquefort, Laguiole, and Cantal cheeses, as well as red wine from the nearby village of Marcillac. Fouace is a breakfast item, a sweet bread that can be found in many local bakeries.

Local culture and heritage
The town centre is almost exclusively pedestrianised and is filled with history, as well as shops and local artisans. The agglomeration of Grand Rodez comprises the towns of Rodez, Onet-le-Château, Druelle, Luc-la-Primaube, Le Monastère, Olemps, Sainte-Radegonde and Sébazac-Concourès.

Places and monuments
In addition, many buildings, houses, places, places of worship and châteaux are registered and protected by the state.

Since 3 February 2012, the Ruthenois Piton is classified among the "big sites" of Midi-Pyrénées and a steering committee is preparing the candidature of Rodez to the label of Towns and Lands of Art and History as well as the UNESCO World Heritage.

Religious buildings

Notre-Dame Cathedral

Made an Historic Monument in 1862.

The Cathedral of Notre-Dame of Rodez is the main religious building of the department. Burned, damaged over the centuries, the Cathedral of Rodez is a remarkable compendium of architectural styles from the 13th century to the 17th century: Gothic, Renaissance and Baroque interior decoration elements. The building is equipped with a beautiful bell tower, genuine laced pink sandstone, visible from afar, dominating the top of the city of its . Four hundred steps climb to reach the statue of the Virgin (located at the top of the bell tower) and the magnificent panorama of the city. At night, it is illuminated from inside.

Episcopal Palace

The  was made an Historic Monument in 1942.

The old episcopal palace of the 15th century, lay between the transept of the present cathedral and the rampart of the city. Paul-Louis-Philippe de Lezay de Lusignan was appointed Bishop of Rodez in 1684. He began the construction of the current palace upon his arrival, which ended in 1694. The palace was built in the style of Louis XIII with a staircase reminiscent of the Château de Fontainebleau.

Presbytery

Made an Historic Monument in 1950.

Saint-Amans Church

The  was made an Historic Monument in 1943. It was built in the 12th century and then completely rebuilt from 1758 to 1761 with materials salvaged from the original building. The exterior is Baroque but the interior has maintained its Romanesque style. The dome was decorated in the 18th century by Salinier. Tapestries of the 6th century decorate the choir and represent the miracles of Saint Amans. It retains a 15th-century Pietà and a statue of the Trinity (16th century), as well as a Limoges enamel reliquary casket.

Sacré-Cœur Church

The  was made an Historic Monument in 2005. Its construction was inspired by the Abbey Church of Saint Foy in Conques with notable influences from major Périgord churches.

Chapel of the former Jesuit college
Made an Historic Monument in 1927.

Ancient monastery

Made an Historic Monument in 1942.

The national stud is now installed in this former religious building.

Others

The , last vestige of the asylum for the insane, where the Paraire writer and poet Antonin Artaud was confined. Today, it houses a 'space Antonin Artaud'.
The chapel of Saint-Martin, it was situated halfway up, overlooking Layoule. Before 1789, it served as a Ruthenoise parish, and then before the second world war, deposit garbage and playgrounds for children. In ruins since the war, it was entirely demolished in 1966.
The Chapel of Our Lady of Mercy, located on the Chemin de la Boriette (a remote green space). Owned by the municipality of Rodez, it was originally incorporated into La Chartreuse (today the ). Restored by the Companions of the Duty, it is open to the public in the afternoon on good days.
The Rodez mosque, inaugurated in May 2003 and remarkable for its architecture, is located on the Avenue Bamberg.

Civil buildings

Hôtel de la préfecture
Made an Historic Monument in 1947. The hotel was built in the first half of the 18th century by François Le Normant d'Ayssènes, counsellor to the king, and his receiver in the election of Rodez. It is now home to the prefecture of the Aveyron.

Hôtel de Bonald

Made an Historic Monument in 1991.

Hôtel du Cheval Noir

Made an Historic Monument in 1947.

Hôtel Séguret

Made an Historic Monument in 1944.

Maison d'Armagnac

Made an Historic Monument in 1862.

Maisons bourgeoises

Layoule Bridge

Made an Historic Monument in 1947.

Château de Saint-Félix

Made an Historic Monument in 1984.

La Gascarie Viaduct

Railway bridges of the 19th century, including the Gascarie Viaduct.

Parks and gardens

Foirail public garden
Square François Fabié: This small square presents a very broad view of all the southern part of the Rodez territory.

Rodez was awarded with three flowers of the competition of flowery cities and villages, was awarded 1st place in 1996, and 3rd in 2007. Rodez also has the label "Child-friendly city", given by UNICEF.

It is a place which is dedicated to the activities of its equestrian centre and its holiday-village accommodation. Vabre Park offers children's activities with outdoor games. Rodez has an 18-hole golf course located more precisely in the commune of Onet-le-Château. Layoule, located on the edge of the Aveyron river, offers a route laid out for pedestrians or cyclists. Finally, there is also a guide Les Belles Balades de l’Aveyron [The beautiful walks of the Aveyron]. The Foirail, where the cultural buildings are integrated, offers a natural setting in the heart of the city.

Cultural heritage

Linguistic heritage

This language has become, over the years, a real cultural crossroads of the Pays d'Oc in the service of the revival of Occitan culture.

Learned society

This cultural institution was recognised as being of public utility on 29 October 1857. It is open to researchers, teachers, students, and to all those who are interested in the culture of Aveyron and the Rouergue. The Society of Letters, Sciences and Arts of Aveyron has a library of more than 50,000 books and several archival fonds.

Museums

Rodez has three museums:

Musée Fenaille classified MH (1944): Museum of history and archaeology with a unique collection of statues and menhirs of the Rouergue. Its collections also include sculptures from other periods: antiquity, the Middle Ages, the Renaissance and modern times.
Musée des beaux-arts Denys-Puech: Museum of contemporary art in which the sculptures and paintings of Denys Puech are shown, and which also hosts many temporary exhibitions.
Musée Soulages: Soulages Museum, Museum of France, opened 31 May 2014. A large part of the works of Pierre Soulages and temporary exhibitions of international scope are shown.

Art galleries

Galerie Foch, open to all artists
La Menuiserie
Private galleries

Others

Large multimedia library of Rodez, rich in old and current works.
A House of Associations, close to the square of the sacred heart, to open its doors in January 2012. It allows activities of a social, cultural, educational, sporting or environmental character to be carried out.

Cultural facilities
Cultural centre L'Amphithéâtre offers sports functions with several sports halls on several disciplines (fencing, climbing, badminton, dance etc.) as well as a large room accommodating up to 3000 people and being adaptable for congresses, trade shows, conferences, debates, seminars, shows or theatrical performances. In addition, for shows, concerts and other artistic performances, the programming of the facility offers a great place to internationally recognised artists.
House of Youth and Culture offers opportunities for theatre and shows, entertainments, or congresses and conferences, exhibitions (several rooms of different capacity).
Salle des fêtes [Festival hall]: Near Haras and the Paul Lignon Stadium, the hall of  opened on 7 January 2012, by its designer, Emmanuel Nebout and political representatives. A futuristic and original architecture, it marks the total break between the historical centre and the new district. It has the distinction of offering a large discovery area and its configuration allows it to accommodate with its facilities (dressing rooms, locker rooms, stage, audio-visual, widescreen) of fairs, exhibitions, festivals and events by associations and businesses. In this room, is juxtaposed another (which can be split into two). It can serve as a dressing room or bar, or even of meeting room. Finally, on the floors, three meeting rooms are available. The entire building is in synergy and complementary to the restructuring and enlargement of the Paul Lignon Stadium, and more broadly with the multiplex, and the museum, to meet economic or cultural events.
Palais des Congrès [Congress hall]: Boulevard de la République, it meets an economic role for enterprises, associations with several committee rooms and an auditorium and exhibition hall.
National School of Music of the Grand Rodez: Music, exhibitions, conferences and debates.
This building is located in the commune of Onet-le-Château and can also accommodate conventions and conferences with broadcast equipment, image and sound equipment with the latest technologies. The theatre, or more accurately the auditorium occupies  for 500 seats at the service of culture. Finally this auditorium of 500 seats is adjustable to 300 or 500 places. With a prestigious cultural programming, this building is a centre of culture in south-western France.
Exhibition Park of Malan: Economic and cultural infrastructure, located on the edge of the RN88, this place is modular for congress, exhibitions, shows based on events, and offers entertainment venues and catering. It can accommodate up to 3000 people. Opening in 2015.
Several municipal halls (municipal campsite, Calcomier, Saint-Eloi, Grange of Vabres and Foch parking) for meetings, activities, events.

Personalities linked to the commune
 (1501-1529), Bishop of Rodez.
Jean Salvanh (1510s – after 1580), architect 
Laurent Macte or Macty, native doctor of Colmars (Alpes de Haute-Provence). He left the city in 1564 to study medicine in Montpellier, then in 1567, came practise in Rodez. He left a book of reason evoking the troubles of his time and its manifestations in Rodez. The  studied and chronicled in volume 25 of his memoirs in 1942 the 'journal' of this character. Laurent Macte died at the beginning of the 17th century in Rodez.
Ambroise Crozot, painter born in Rodez at the end of the 17th century.
Jean Calmette (1692-1740), Jesuit, missionary to India, Indologist, was born in Rodez.
Saint  (born in Rodez in 1739-1824), Bishop under the First Empire
 (1749-1792), man of the Church, scientific, speleologist.
, general of division and French revolutionary, born in Rodez.
Antoine Bernardin Fualdès (1761-1817), prosecutor, assassinated.
 (1763-1847), French general of the Gendarmerie.
 (1763-1848), brigade general (1806), Knight of the Empire (letters patent of 22 October 1810), mayor of Rodez.
 , born in Rodez.
Amans-Alexis Monteil was born on 7 June 1769 in Rodez. A school bears his name.
Raymond Gayrard, engraver and sculptor, born in 1777 in Rodez, died in 1858 in Paris (he was responsible for the statue of Samson that adorned the Place d'Armes in Rodez).
 (1801-1887), brother of the preceding, lawyer, historian, Vice President of the Société des lettres, sciences et arts de l'Aveyron, legitimist.
Natalis Flaugergues (1823-1893), soldier and author in 1874 of a text where he claimed that Rodez is at the centre of the world.
 (1842-1916), writer, historian, Member of Parliament and Senator of Aveyron.
Antonin Artaud (1896-1948), writer and poet, interned from February 1943 to May 1946 in the Paraire departmental lunatic asylum.
, lawyer, the Bar Association of Rodez, Conservative deputy in 1936 and 1945.
Eugène Raynaldy (1869-1938), French politician born in Rodez, he was Senator of Aveyron from 1930 to 1938.
 (1904-1988), French politician born in Rodez.
Idebert Exbrayat, pastor, born in 1913 in Calvisson, organized in Rodez the rescue of many Jews during the Occupation. He was named as his wife, Righteous Among the Nations
 (1914-1983), writer, resistant and French academic born in Rodez.
Pierre Soulages, painter, engraver, and sculptor, born in Rodez in 1919.
Marie-Eugène de l'Enfant-Jésus (1894, 1967), born Henri Grialou in the Gua Quarter, he became a priest in the Carmelite order. He is in the process of beatification.
Jean Fabre, French Rugby Union international, occupied the position of flanker in the Stade Toulousain during the 1960s, born in 1935 in Rodez.
, born in Rodez on 24 January 1936, politician, Mayor of Rodez from 1983 to 2008 and president of the regional Council of Midi-Pyrénées from 1988 to 1998.
Bertrand Delanoë, former Mayor of Paris, spent his teenage years in Rodez and studied at the private Lycée François d'Estaing.
 (1949-2008), the first Rodez cardio-surgeon to implant a coronary stent, in 1986.
François Kevorkian, DJ and music producer, was born in Rodez in 1954.
Dominique Reynié (1960-), political scientist, born in Rodez.
Bernard Laporte, born in Rodez in 1964, former Secretary of State of sports, former coach of France's rugby union team, ex-UA Gaillac, and the CA Béglais, former coach of the Stade Bordelais and the Stade Français.
Gaëtan Roussel, born 13 October 1972 in Rodez, singer and founder of the rock band Louise Attaque.
Olivier Asmaker, cyclist and teammate of Laurent Jalabert, grew up in Rodez.
Cyril Lignac, cook and host on M6, was born 5 November 1977 in Rodez and studied in Aveyron.
Julien Pierre, international rugby, second line of ASM Clermont Auvergne, born in 1981 in Rodez.
Sabrina Viguier (b. 1981), French football player who currently plays for Olympique Lyonnais and France's football team (last selection in 2011).
Alexandre Geniez, professional cyclist, born in 1988.

Heraldry, logo and motto

Heraldry

Logo of Rodez

The Rodez logo consists of a small yellow drawing representing the branch from the bottom of the Occitan cross - this cross on the flag of Midi-Pyrénées - and the Rodez name in red capitals. The upper part of the logo, meanwhile, represents the Cathedral of Rodez perched on its "piton". The slogan: "Rodez, un art de ville" [Rodez, a city of art] is sometimes added to the logo.

See also
Communes of the Aveyron department
Diocese of Rodez

Bibliography

Geography - geology
 (BnF no FRBNF37310789k)

 (BnF no FRBNF37699009h)

Urbanism - administration
 (BnF no FRBNF35672189w)
 (BnF no FRBNF42563529p)
 (BnF no FRBNF436441407)
 (BnF no FRBNF42558960x)
 (BnF no FRBNF42798334w)

History
 (BnF no FRBNF347314452)
 (BnF no FRBNF355239116)
 (BnF no FRBNF358567941)

Prehistory - Antiquity
 (BnF no FRBNF412679142)
 (BnF no FRBNF37394724m)
 (BnF no FRBNF391067005)

Middle Ages
 (BnF no FRBNF366194132)
 (BnF no FRBNF35006033g)
 (BnF no FRBNF34938787v)
 (BnF no FRBNF36653510p)
 (BnF no FRBNF35552831x)
 (BnF no FRBNF36684881w)
 (BnF no FRBNF358230477)
 (BnF no FRBNF38974346k)
 (BnF no FRBNF40063427k)
 (BnF no FRBNF35041801p)
 (BnF no FRBNF30124501n)
 (BnF no FRBNF421992862)

Modern era
 (BnF no FRBNF371088281)
 (BnF no FRBNF400876830)
 (BnF no FRBNF40933482n)

French Revolution
(BnF no FRBNF31721391)

Contemporary era
 (BnF no FRBNF426392422)
 (BnF no FRBNF34765733g)
 (BnF no FRBNF36158882q)

The Fualdès Case
 (BnF no FRBNF366528030)
 (BnF no FRBNF366583679)
 (BnF no FRBNF37082505k)
 (BnF no FRBNF41438489j)
 (BnF no FRBNF366300167)

Notre-Dame Cathedral
 (BnF no FRBNF34684767s)
 (BnF no FRBNF37070394s)
 (BnF no FRBNF34968270c)
 (BnF no FRBNF35551957n)
 (BnF no FRBNF35740777m)
 (BnF no FRBNF37650052n)
 (BnF no FRBNF400248540)
 (BnF no FRBNF41312162n)

Miscellaneous
 (BnF no FRBNF33110879n)
 (BnF no FRBNF34713536f)
 (BnF no FRBNF366694493)
 (BnF no FRBNF370320322)
 (BnF no FRBNF391035346)
 (BnF no FRBNF37716179r)
 (BnF no FRBNF412817792)
 (BnF no FRBNF42392658k)
 (BnF no FRBNF42434972c)
 (BnF no FRBNF42802950n)

Notes

References

External links

 Official website 
 Office of Tourism in English

Communes of Aveyron
Prefectures in France
Ruteni
Rouergue